Leslie D. Zettergren is an American biomedical researcher. He was born in 1943.

Career 
He received a BS degree from Southern Illinois University and a PhD from Tulane University.

He was a faculty member at Carroll University in Waukesha, Wisconsin.

His research is focused on understanding the development of the amphibian and avian immune systems.

External links

References 

1943 births
Living people
American medical researchers
Carroll University faculty
Southern Illinois University alumni
Tulane University alumni